Elections to Waltham Forest Council were held in May 1998.  The whole council was up for election for the first time since the 1994 election.

Waltham Forest local elections are held every four years, with the next due in 2002.

Election result

|}

Ward results

References

1998
1998 London Borough council elections